Sim Van der Ryn is an American architect.  He is also a researcher and educator.  Van der Ryn's professional interest has been applying principles of physical and social ecology to architecture and environmental design.

Van der Ryn has promoted sustainable design at the community scale and the building-specific scale. He has designed single-family and multi-family housing, community facilities, retreat centers and resorts, learning facilities, as well as office and commercial buildings.

Biography

Van der Ryn was appointed California State Architect in the administration of Governor Jerry Brown in the late 1970s. Van der Ryn was in the architecture faculty at the University of California, Berkeley. He lives in California.

Early life
Sim Van Der Ryn was born in 1935  (age 85) in the Netherlands. His family moved to Queens, New York, then moved to Great Neck, New York on Long Island.

Education  
He received education at the University of Michigan, Ann Arbor, graduating at the age of 24 with a degree in B.Arch., in 1958. During that year he moved to California and joined the UC Berkeley faculty where he became an educator for 35 years. Later in his career, he was listed as a state architect in California and New Mexico. Sim also, became a licensed architect where he received a certification by the National Council of Architectural Registration Boards (NCARB).

Teaching career
Assistant Professor, University of California, Berkeley (UCB), Berkeley, CA. 1958-1966.
Associate Professor, University of California, Berkeley, Berkeley, CA, 1966-1970.
Professor, University of California, Berkeley, Berkeley, CA, 1970.
Goff Chair of Innovative Architecture, University of Oklahoma, Norman, OK, 2001.
Professor Emeritus of Architecture, University of California, Berkeley, 2019.

Professional efforts

Sim’s vision has always been to include ecological values and philosophies to the built environment.  He introduced new academic intervention programs through elementary schools in Berkeley, California One of the programs motto was “trash can do it” this method of recycling materials would encourage students to utilize resources through a new approach. The hands-on methods of understanding allowed students to grasped a real-life perspective of different materials and convert them to environmentally functional projects. The program Created opportunities to enhance and develop manual, intellectual and social skills. They have created and established a do it yourself guideline to rectify educational systems. 

Sim had an innovate and unconventional approach to teaching.  In his classes he insisted on creating a more balanced force between male and female candies. He persisted with this criteria and was able to create a more equal environment for all future professionals. His vision towards Architecture was to provide women with similar opportunities as men instructing to accept equal applicants of men and women in the early 70s.  “Outlaw builder studio” was a significant platform for sim van der ryn to demonstrate his new ecological and solar architecture where his students develop building and social skills. Students created, designed and built accordingly to their need while living in the outdoors for at least three days of the week. Later on, some of the projects were taken down because they didn’t meet building codes and requirements. This was met with some scrutiny in his teaching career from his peers and other professionals. 

Energy pavilion was a followed project in the early 70s.  This project provided the first mainstream booklet on solar architecture. Students were able to construct an early design of solar panels. This energy efficient design was a futuristic outlook in ecological and environmental architecture. At the time of this project the world was witnessing the dilemmas of the oil crisis. Sim encouraged his studio to connect with the surrounding environment and maintain a cohesive approach in design.

Projects 
State of California, Energy Resources and Conservation and Development Building, Sacramento, CA
State of California, Department of Justice, Office Building #1, Sacramento, CA 1977-1978.
State of California, State Office Building, Sacramento, CA, 1977-1978 
State of California, Water Resources Control Board Building, Sacramento, CA 
State of California, State Office Building, San Jose, CA
The Ojai Foundation School Ojai, CA.
Green Gulch Zen Center Muir Beach, CA
Real Goods Solar Living Center Hopland, California, 1996

Artwork

Sim desired to become a painter he believed that design is a gate to understand ourselves through nature. He taught different watercolor classes to his students and found it to be meditative state. Sim also found it to be a starting point for a designer to integrate with nature and begin to collaborate with it.

Awards
Recipient, Guggenheim Fellowship, 1971. 
Recipient, American Institute of Architects, California Council (AIACC), Commendation for Excellence in Technology, 1981.
Recipient, AIACC, Nathaniel Owings Award, 1996.
Recipient, Rockefeller Scholar in Residence, Bellagio, Italy, 1997 and 2012.
Fellowship, Graham Foundation for Advanced Studies in the Fine Arts, Chicago, IL, 1997.
President's Award for Planning, American Society of Landscape Architects (ASLA Colorado Chapter) for the Arbolera de Vida Master Plan, Albuquerque, NM, 1997.
Recipient, Congress for the New Urbanism, Athena Medal, 2008

Publications
Van der Ryn, Sim and Stuart Cowan (2007). Ecological Design, Tenth Anniversary Edition. Washington, DC: Island Press. 
Van der Ryn, Sim (2005). Design For Life: The Architecture of Sim Van der Ryn. Layton, UT: Gibbs Smith. 
Van der Ryn, Sim and Stuart Cowan (1996). Ecological Design. Washington, DC: Island Press. 
Calthorpe, Peter and Sim Van der Ryn (1986). Sustainable Communities: A New Design Synthesis for Cities, Suburbs and Towns. San Francisco: Sierra Club Books. 
Van der Ryn, Sim and the Farallones Institute, Helga & William Olkowski (1982). The Integral Urban House. NY: Random House. 
Van der Ryn, Sim (1978). The Toilet Papers. Santa Barbara, CA: Capra Press. 

Van de Ryn also contributed a foreword to the book Handmade Houses: A Guide to the Woodbutcher's Art by Art Boericke and Barry Shapiro.

Van der Ryn, Sim (2013). Design for an Empathic World: Reconnecting People, Nature, and Self 2nd None ed. Edition. 
Van der Ryn, Sim (2013). Culture, Architecture and Nature: An Ecological Design Retrospective 1st Edition. 
Temko, Allan, “California’s New Generation of Energy Efficient State Buildings”,AIA Journal,66: 13,50-56,12/1977.
Lencher, Norbert,Heating Cooling Lighting, Design Methods for Architects, 450-455,1991.
Bednar, Michael J., Interior Pedestrian Places, 131,1989.
“Getting Architects Involved Community Action”, Journal of the American Institute of Architects, 46:5,89,11/1966.
Stein, Benjamin, Reynolds, John S., Mechanical and Electrical Equipment for Buildings, 259-265,1992
Woodbridge, Sally, “Governing Energy: California State Office Building”, Progressive Architecture, 56:4,86-91,04/1984
“An architect child of the’60s whose time has come”, Seattle Times, Sect I:16,10/22/2005.
Brown, G.Z., DEKAY, Mark, “Mechanical Mass Ventilation”, Sun, Wind & Light, 284, 288, 2001.

See also
 Paolo Soleri
 Mike Reynolds
 Tom Bender

References

External links
Van der Ryn Projects
Ecological Design Institute

Sustainability advocates
Solar building designers
UC Berkeley College of Environmental Design faculty
American architects
Living people
Taubman College of Architecture and Urban Planning alumni
People from Kew Gardens, Queens
Year of birth missing (living people)
People from Great Neck, New York